Druogno is a comune (municipality) in the Province of Verbano-Cusio-Ossola in the Italian region Piedmont, located about  northeast of Turin and about  north of Verbania.

Druogno borders the following municipalities: Masera, Santa Maria Maggiore, Trontano.

Demographic evolution

References

Cities and towns in Piedmont